Gerald "Gerry" Bridgwood (17 October 1944 – 2 March 2012) was a footballer who played in the Football League for Shrewsbury Town and Stoke City. Bridgwood spent eight years at Stoke, in which time he was used as backup and was used sparingly by manager Tony Waddington.

Career
Bridgwood started his career with local team Stoke City and made his professional debut at the end of the 1960–61 season at home to Brighton & Hove Albion. It took him  a while to establish himself in Tony Waddingtons squad and he was used as a back up player in his time at Stoke. In total Bridgwood played in 111 matches for Stoke scoring eight goals in nine seasons. His most productive season was the 1966–67 as he made 26 appearances. He also played six matches in the club's run to the 1964 Football League Cup Final. He left for regular football in 1968 and joined Shrewsbury Town where he spent five years before ending his career with Telford United.

Personal life
After finishing his playing career Bridgwood and his wife Cynthia became pub landlords. They owned The Greyhound (Stafford) for many years. Since the early 1990s they owned the Crown Inn, Goostrey. Bridgwood's eldest son, Mark, a ceramic artist, lives with his family in U.S. His youngest son, Scott is a painter in the UK.

Death
Gerry Bridgwood died on 2 March 2012 after a suspected heart attack just days after he had decided to retire from the pub trade.

Career statistics
Source:

References

External links
 

1944 births
2012 deaths
English footballers
Stoke City F.C. players
Shrewsbury Town F.C. players
Telford United F.C. players
English Football League players
Footballers from Stoke-on-Trent
Association football midfielders